Chekhovsky (masculine), Chekhovskaya (feminine), or Chekhovskoye (neuter) may refer to:
Chekhovsky District, a district of Moscow Oblast, Russia
Chekhovsky (rural locality) (Chekhovskaya, Chekhovskoye), name of several rural localities in Russia
Chekhovskaya, a station of the Moscow Metro, Moscow, Russia

See also
Chekhov (disambiguation)
Chekhovo